ASTM A354 is an ASTM International standard that defines chemical and mechanical properties for alloy steel bolts, screws, studs, and other externally threaded fasteners. It is officially titled: Standard Specification for Quenched and Tempered Alloy Steel Bolts, Studs, and Other Externally Threaded Fasteners.

This is a standard set by the standards organization ASTM International, a voluntary standards development organizations that sets technical standards for materials, products, systems, and services.

Mechanical properties
This standard defines the properties for fasteners up to 4 inches in diameter. They are not to be used in applications where they are tensioned to more than 50% of their tensile strength. In those applications structural heavy hex bolts are to be used, as defined by ASTM A490, even though they have the same strength.

Recommended nuts
The standard also specifies what nuts are recommended for use with the defined fasteners. Note that nuts of a greater strength can also be used.

References

ASTM standards
Screws